Ashram Shambala is a Russian sect founded in Novosibirsk in 1989 by Konstantin Rudnev. It is a mixture of occult and esoteric teachings. The cult consisted of approximately 20,000 followers. Since 1990, sect branches operated in 18 regions of Russia and also in Moscow and St. Petersburg.

History
Sect founder Rudnev graduated from the school and the engineering college, then he served in the Soviet Army, where offered to create a monastery like Shaolin. During the guard, Rudnev unreasonably opened fire with an assault rifle, after which he was sent to Samara psychiatric hospital. In 1989, he returned to Novosibirsk, where he founded the Ashram Shambala

When a sufficient number of followers came to the sect, "Ashram Shambala" began to organize spirit classes in the basement of the school on Relsovaya Street in Zaeltsovsky District. Rudnev first called himself Guru Sotidanandana for a good promotion of the sect, then the legend was invented that a sage living in Tibet is a teacher of Rudnev, etc.

Rudnev was arrested in 1999, but escaped from a psychiatric hospital during his checkup.

In 2005, he was again detained, but his followers refused to testify against him.

Arrest and trial
Rudnev was detained again on September 30, 2010, and on October 2, a court arrested him. During search and seizure in the sect’s houses, which were located in one of the horticultural societies of the Novosibirsky District, the police found a lot of audio and video recordings of the rituals, ritual accessories, as well as 4 grams of heroin.

In 2013, a Novosibirsk Сourt sentenced Rudnev to 11 years in a colony of strict regimen. He was accused of creating an association related to violence, he was also charged with rape, indecent assault. In addition, the creator of the sect was accused of distributing illegal drugs.

Return of confiscated property
A year later, after the trial of Rudnev, the court returned the confiscated cottages and cars to the sect. In March 2016, the Central District Court of Novosibirsk returned the "priestess" Oksana Spiridonova (Rudnev’s assistant) gold and part of the money: 40,060 rubles, 550 euros, 2 US dollars, 50 yuan, 5 hryvnias and 40 rupees.

Sect features
Rudnev called himself "extra-terrestrial from Sirius". His followers called him Great Shaman Shri Dzhnan Avatar Muni.

Adherents of the sect were reported to have practiced group sex and bestiality.

Sectarians lived in difficult conditions in the sect, slept three or four hours a day and ate very little. People lost their teeth, and then were told: "You are being reborn into a man of the sixth race who does not need teeth, because he feed by divine energy."

"The Way of the Fool"
The teachings of the sect were set forth in "The Way of the Fool", a book by Rudnev, in which he urged to abandon the traditional way of life.

Recollection of a former adept of the sect about his impressions of the book "The Way of the Fool" and about the website of the same name, which the "priestess of love" Anastasia (Nastya) advised him to visit:

It all started with a recommendation to visit a site called "The Way of the Fool": "for spiritual development". But I immediately felt bad from its design: half-naked girls, strange words. Nastya also advised to read Rudnev’s book, The Way of the Fool. I began to read it, but I was not able to overpower this nonsense, for I had never seen such an abomination in my life. Not only that, almost after every word were obscene words, there was no general sense. Diary of a Madman. In short, I came to the site and left it, I opened the book and closed it, without delving into the content.I shared my impressions with Nastya. She laughed in response and said that this was done specifically to scare away "social mice", that is, ordinary people who were not given the understanding of the wisdom of Shambala.Sources of income
Rudnev organized various paid seminars: yoga seminars, seminars on the esoteric foundations of business, sexual liberation seminars, etc. In 2010, a similar lecture by the guru of "Ashram Shambala" cost 53 thousand rubles per person.

The sect sold various magic items: amulets and talismans.

People sold their apartments, cars and gave all the money to the sect.

Sect center
The center of the sect is located in a mansion on Kosmonavtov Street 1a in the Sovetsky City District of Novosibirsk.

 Bibliography 

 Alban Bourdy, Un Bisounours au pays des se(x)ctes'', Books On Demand, 2018. A testimony of a former follower of the sect.

References

External links
 В Новосибирской области арестован создатель секты. Телеканал НТВ. The creator of the sect was arrested in the Novosibirsk Oblast. NTV channel. September 27, 2004.

Crime in Novosibirsk
Religion in Novosibirsk
Organizations based in Novosibirsk
Religious organizations based in Russia
Religious organizations established in 1989
Sects